Spuk am Tor der Zeit is the conclusion of the trilogy The Mummy of Roggelin. The children's series based on the "Spooky" series by Günter Meyer is thus the continuation of Spuk im Reich der Schatten (Ghost in the Realm of Shadows).

Synopsis
Marko (13) experiences a fantastic adventure. He lives in a village and makes a huge discovery in the cemetery. From a family vault, he is drawn into a time tunnel and lands in 1766. There, he meets one of his ancestors, who is only thirteen years old himself. Both are confused, and thus begins their adventure.

Episodes
The gate in the time
The big game
Butterflies in the hay
Tree of Remembrance

See also
Spuk aus der Gruft (1997)
Spuk im Reich der Schatten (2000)
List of German television series

References

External links
 

German children's television series
German fantasy television series
2002 German television series debuts
2002 German television series endings
German-language television shows